Hino Station (日野駅) is the name of three train stations in Japan:

 Hino Station (Nagano)
 Hino Station (Shiga)
 Hino Station (Tokyo)
 Bushū-Hino Station